Ratibida is a genus of North American plants in the tribe Heliantheae within the family Asteraceae. Members of the genus are commonly known as prairie coneflowers or mexican-hat.

Species
There are 7 species:
 Ratibida coahuilensis B.L.Turner - Coahuila
 Ratibida columnifera (Nutt.) Wooton & Standl. – upright prairie coneflower - widespread in Canada, United States, and northeastern Mexico
 Ratibida latipalearis E.L.Richards - Chihuahua
 Ratibida mexicana (S.Watson) W.M.Sharp - Chihuahua, Coahuila, Sonora
 Ratibida peduncularis (Torr. & A.Gray) Barnhart – naked prairie coneflower - Louisiana, Texas
 Ratibida pinnata (Vent.) Barnhart – pinnate prairie coneflower - Ontario, eastern + central United States (primarily Great Lakes + Mississippi Valley)
 Ratibida tagetes (E.James) Barnhart – short-ray prairie coneflower - Chihuahua,  United States (desert southwest, western Great Plains)

References

External links
 
 

Flora of North America
Heliantheae
Asteraceae genera
Taxa named by Constantine Samuel Rafinesque